Mahadeorao Sukaji Shivankar (born 7 April 1940) is an Indian politician belonging to Bharatiya Janata Party (BJP).

He was elected to Maharashtra assembly in 1978, 1980, 1985, 1995 and 1999 from Amgaon (Vidhan Sabha constituency). He was minister of irrigation and command area development under Manohar Joshi's government in Maharashtra in 1990s.

Later, he was a member of the 14th Lok Sabha (2004–2009) from Chimur constituency in Maharashtra.

External links
 Official biographical sketch in Parliament of India website

Living people
1940 births
Bharatiya Janata Party politicians from Maharashtra
People from Gondia district
India MPs 2004–2009
People from Gondia
Marathi politicians
Lok Sabha members from Maharashtra
State cabinet ministers of Maharashtra
Maharashtra MLAs 1995–1999
India MPs 1989–1991
People from Chandrapur district